Voskreseniye is a Russian rock band.

History
The band was formed in 1979, when drummer Sergey Kavagoe decided to leave Mashina Vremeni and form his own group. Kavagoe was joined by Mashina Vremeni's bassist, Evgeny Margulis. Alexey Romanov became the group's leader and songwriter, and Alexey Makarevich joined as guitarist. During this period the band released the successful albums Voskreseniye 1 and Voskreseniye 2. In 1980, Margulis left the group, after being invited to join the group Araks, and Konstantin Nikolsky, Andrey Sapunov, and Mikhail Shevyakov joined the line-up. In August 1982, Romanov and the group's sound engineer, Alexander Arutyunov, were arrested and charged with private entrepreneurial activity. The band went on a hiatus from 1982 to 1994, and former members played in several other groups.

Romanov, Sapunov, Nikolsky, and Shevyakov reunited in 1989 to play at the Druzhba arena in a concert celebrating the group's tenth anniversary. The group officially reformed in 1994, performing on March 12 with a line-up of Romanov, Sapunov, Nikolsky, and Shevyakov, with Nikolsky serving as the group's leader. Nikolsky left the group shortly afterwards, due to creative differences, and Romanov asked Margulis to rejoin. Voskreseniye performed its first concert with this new line-up in St. Petersburg on May 1, sharing the bill with Cruise. In 2001, they released a new album, called Vse Snachala, which contained re-recordings of old songs. In 2003, the band released a new album with new songs called Ne Toropyas.

Members

Current members 

 Alexey Romanov –  lead vocals, guitar (1979–1982, 1994–present)
 Alexey Korobkov –  drums (2003–present)
 Yuri Smolyakov –  keyboards, backing vocals (2016–present)
 Sergey Timofeev –  bass (2017–present)

Former members 

 Andrey Sapunov – vocals, guitar, bass (1979–1982, 1994–2016, died 2020)
 Evgeny Margulis – vocals, bass, guitar (1979, 1980, 1994–2003)
 Alexey Makarevich – guitar (1979–1980, 1994; died 2014)
 Sergey Kawagoe – drums, keyboards (1979–1980; died 2008)
 Sergey Kuzminok – trumpet (1980)
 Pavel Smeyan – saxophone (1980; died 2009)
 Alik Mikoyan – guitar (1980)
 Konstantin Nikolsky – vocals, guitar (1980–1982, 1994)
 Mikhail Shevyakov – drums (1980–1982, 1994–2003)
 Dmitry Leontiev – bass (2008–2017)

Discography

Studio albums 

 1979-1980 – Voskreseniye 1
 1981 – Voskreseniye 2
 2001 – Vse Snachala
 2003 –  Ne Toropyas

Live albums 

 1989 –  Anniversary Concert "10 Years of Voskreseniye"
 1994 – Concert. DK Mekhtekh (recording of 1982 show)
 1995 –  My vas lyubim (recording of June 16, 1994 show)
 1995 – Zhiveye vsekh zhivykh (recording of March 28, 1995 show)
 1998 – Zhivaya kollektsiya (recording of television concert)
 2000 – 50 na dvoikh (recording of joint concert with Mashina Vremeni in Moscow's Olympic Stadium)
 2003 – Ne Toropyas Live 
 2005 – Posmotri, kak ya zhivu
 2005 – Ya privyk brodit' odin 

Compilations 

1996 – Legends of Russian Rock vol 1
2002 – Legends of Russian Rock vol 2
2005 – Grand Collection
2009 –The Best
2010 –The Best songs

References

External links
 Official site (Russian)
 Fan-club (Russian)
 Another fan-site (Russian)
 History of the band on another web-site (Russian)
 

Musical groups from Moscow
Russian rock music groups
Musical groups established in 1979
Soviet rock music groups